The tufted titmouse (Baeolophus bicolor) is a small songbird from North America, a species in the tit and chickadee family (Paridae). The black-crested titmouse, found from central and southern Texas southward, was included as a subspecies but now is considered a separate species, Baeolophus atricristatus.

Taxonomy 
The genus name Baeolophus translates to small crested and is a compound of the Ancient Greek words : baiós—"small", and : "lόphοs"—crest. The species name bicolor means two-colored.

Description 
Measurements:

 Length: 
 Weight: 
 Wingspan: 

These small birds have a white front and grey upper body outlined with rust colored flanks. Other characteristics include their black foreheads and the tufted grey crest on their heads. In juveniles, the black forehead is greatly diminished such that they may be confused with the oak titmouse (although their ranges do not overlap). Males tend to be larger than females.

The song of the tufted titmouse is usually described as a whistled peter-peter-peter, although this song can vary in approximately 20 notable ways.

Distribution and habitat
Its habitat is deciduous and mixed woods as well as gardens, parks, and shrublands. Although the tufted titmouse is non-migratory and originally native to the Ohio and Mississippi River basins, factors such as bird feeders have caused these birds to occupy a larger territory across the United States and stretching into Ontario and Quebec in Canada. During the second half of the 20th century and into the 21st century, the species' range has been expanding northwards.

Behavior and ecology
The tufted titmouse gathers food from the ground and from tree branches, frequently consuming a variety of berries, nuts, seeds, small fruits, insects, and other invertebrates. Caterpillars constitute a major part of its diet during the summer. This species is also a regular visitor to bird feeders. Its normal pattern is to scout a feeder from cover, fly in to take a seed, then fly back to shelter to consume the morsel, though caching is also very common. 

The titmouse can demonstrate curiosity regarding humans and sometimes will perch on a window ledge and seem to be peering into the house. It may also cling to the windows and walls of buildings seeking prey in wasp and hornet nests. 

Titmice are very vocal and will respond to sounds of agitation in other birds. This species readily forms small flocks, known as troupes or banditries, which often associate with chickadees and other passerines when foraging.

Breeding 
Tufted titmice nest in a hole in a tree, either a natural cavity, a human-made nest box, or sometimes an old woodpecker nest. They line the nest with soft materials, sometimes plucking hair from a live animal such as a dog. If they find snake skin sheds, they may incorporate pieces into their nest. Eggs have an incubation period of 12–14 days; titmice will then remain nestlings for 15–16 days.

The lifespan of the tufted titmouse is approximately 2.1 years, although it can live for more than ten years. On average, these birds will have a clutch size of five to seven eggs. Unlike many birds, the offspring of tufted titmice will often stay with their parents during the winter and even after the first year of their life. Sometimes, a bird born the year before will help its parents raise the next year's young.

Tufted titmice will occasionally hybridize with the black-crested titmouse; the hybridization range is very narrow, however, because of genetic differences.

Status
From 1966 to 2015 the tufted titmouse population has increased by more than 1.5% per year throughout the northeastern U.S. The current breeding population is estimated to be approximately 8 million.

Gallery

References

External links

 
 Tufted titmouse species account – Cornell Lab of Ornithology
 Tufted titmouse – Baeolophus bicolor – USGS Patuxent Bird Identification InfoCenter
 

tufted titmouse
Native birds of the Eastern United States
tufted titmouse
tufted titmouse